Ole Rasmussen (born 3 September 1960) is a Danish football manager and former player, currently managing the Boldklubben Frem reserves.

Rasmussen won national fame when he scored a spectacular own goal in the 1981 Danish Cup final.

External links
Danish national team profile
 Boldklubben Frem profile

1960 births
Living people
Danish men's footballers
Denmark international footballers
Boldklubben Frem players
Danish football managers
Association football defenders
Fremad Amager managers